The 1956 Nicaragua earthquake occurred on October 24 at 14:42 UTC. The epicenter was located west of Masachapa, Managua Department, Nicaragua. It was an earthquake of magnitude  7.3, or  7.2. Building damage was reported in Managua. A study of W. Montero P. shows that this earthquake might be related to the earthquake of Nicoya Peninsula on October 5, 1950. A tsunami was triggered by the earthquake.

See also 
List of earthquakes in 1956
List of earthquakes in Nicaragua

References

External links 

Nicaragua Earthquake, 1956
Earthquakes in Nicaragua
1956 in Nicaragua
October 1956 events in North America